Nutting  is an English surname, first recorded in 1379, when a Willelmus Nuttyng (William Nutting) is mentioned in the Poll Tax rolls of Yorkshire. Nutting may also refer to the action of gathering nuts, or, in colloquial usage, ejaculation.

People
Alissa Nutting, American writer
Sir Anthony Nutting, 3rd Baronet (1920–1999), British diplomat and politician
Charles Cleveland Nutting (1858–1927), American zoologist
Charles William Nutting (1889–1964), British air marshal
Dave Nutting, video game designer
David Nutting (RAF), British RAF squadron leader officer during the Second World War D-Day landings
John (Jack) Gurney Nutting (1871–1946), principal of coachbuilders J Gurney Nutting & Co Limited
John Nutting (radio presenter), Australian radio presenter
John Nutting (politician) (born 1949), American politician
Mary Adelaide Nutting (1858–1948), American nurse and educator
Newton W. Nutting (1840–1889), American politician
Nutting Baronets, title in the Baronetage of the United Kingdom
Perley G. Nutting (1873–1949), American optical physicist
Rex Nutting, American journalist and economist
Robert Nutting (born 1962), American businessman
Wallace Nutting (1861–1941), American minister, photographer, artist, and antiquarian
Wallace H. Nutting (born 1928), United States Army general

Businesses
Nutting Associates, arcade game manufacturer